Tosanoides is a genus of marine ray-finned fish in the subfamily Anthiinae which is part of the family Serranidae, the groupers and sea basses. They are found in the Atlantic and Pacific Ocean.

Species
There are currently six recognized species in this genus:

 Tosanoides annepatrice Pyle, Greene, Copus & Randall, 2018
 Tosanoides aphrodite Pinheiro, C. R. Rocha & L. A. Rocha, 2018 (Aphrodite anthias)
 Tosanoides bennetti Allen & F. Walsh, 2019 (Live specimens were for the first time filmed during a 2020 research project in the Coral Sea by Australian scientists.)
 Tosanoides filamentosus Kamohara, 1953 
 Tosanoides flavofasciatus Katayama & Masuda, 1980
 Tosanoides obama Pyle, Greene & Kosaki, 2016

References

 
Marine fish genera
Anthiinae
Taxa named by Toshiji Kamohara